The Beaman House, located at 230 Fourth Ave. W. in Kalispell, Montana, is a Queen Anne-style house built in 1895.  It was listed on the National Register of Historic Places in 1994.

It is a two-story building with a hipped roof plus four intersecting gabled wings.

References

Houses on the National Register of Historic Places in Montana
Queen Anne architecture in Montana
Houses completed in 1895
National Register of Historic Places in Flathead County, Montana
1895 establishments in Montana
Kalispell, Montana
Houses in Flathead County, Montana